"All Join Hands" is a song by the British rock band Slade, released in 1984 as the lead single from the band's twelfth studio album Rogues Gallery. The song was written by lead vocalist Noddy Holder and bassist Jim Lea, and produced by John Punter. It reached No. 15 in the UK, remaining in the chart for ten weeks.

Background
Slade began recording Rogues Gallery in 1984, with "All Join Hands" being recorded at Angel Recording Studios with producer John Punter. The song, selected as the album's lead single, was released in November 1984 to coincide with the Christmas market. It reached No. 15 in the UK and would be Slade's last Top 40 hit for seven years. In a 1984 interview with Record Mirror, Lea said of the song: "It's another anthem. I come up with these on my way down to the chip shop. It just popped into my head while I was walking down the street. I don't have to sit down at a piano or lock myself in a cottage somewhere."

Release
"All Join Hands" was released on 7" and 12" vinyl by RCA Records in the UK, Ireland, Germany, the Netherlands, Portugal, Spain and Australia. The B-side, "Here's To...", would later appear on the band's 1985 studio/compilation album Crackers: The Christmas Party Album.

On the 12" single, an extended version of "All Join Hands" was featured as the A-side. A limited edition 12" vinyl was also released in the UK, featuring two additional tracks; "My Oh My" and "Merry Xmas Everybody (Live & Kickin')". The latter track had previously appeared as the B-side to the band's 1982 single "(And Now the Waltz) C'est La Vie".

Promotion

A music video was filmed to promote the single, which was directed by Phillip Davey and shot at Ewert Studios in London. The video featured John Otway of Otway & Wild Willy Barrett Really Free fame as the pianist. The video opens with a piano concerto played to a small seated audience in a posh hall. Holder soon enters the room, much to the horror of the audience, while Lea pushes Otway off the piano and begins to play. Hill soon appears to play the guitar solo on top of the piano. The stage lights up and drummer Don Powell appears. As the show is transformed into a Slade gig, the audience are seen to be won over and at the end of the video, they rush the stage after pulling off their evening wear, revealing Slade T-shirts.

In the UK, the band performed the song on the TV shows Top of the Pops, Razamatazz and Saturday Superstore. On one of the Top of the Pops performances, Holder sported two paper cut-out hands on sticks halfway into the performance, while both Lea and guitarist Dave Hill had paper cut-out hands stuck to their guitars. In Germany, the band performed the song on the ZDF show Thommys Pop Show.

Critical reception
In a retrospective review of Crackers: The Christmas Party Album, Dave Thompson of AllMusic said: "...and there's no denying that "Mama Weer All Crazee Now," "My Oh My," "Run Runaway," "Cum on Feel the Noize," and "All Join Hands" will get the fists pumping the air."

Formats
7" single
"All Join Hands" – 4:15
"Here's To..." – 3:12

12" single
"All Join Hands (Extended version)" – 6:15
"Here's To..." – 3:12

12" single (UK limited edition release)
"All Join Hands (Extended version)" – 6:15
"My Oh My" – 4:12
"Here's To..." – 3:12
"Merry Xmas Everybody (Live & Kickin')" – 3:28

Chart performance

Personnel
Slade
Noddy Holder – lead vocals
Jim Lea – piano, bass, synthesiser, backing vocals, producer of "Here's To...", arranger
Dave Hill – lead guitar, backing vocals
Don Powell – drums

Additional personnel
John Punter – producer of "All Join Hands" and "My Oh My"
Slade – producers of "Merry Xmas Everybody (Live & Kickin')"
East St. – design and art
Shoot That Tiger! – logo
Tony McConnell – photography

References

1984 singles
Slade songs
RCA Records singles
Rock ballads
Songs written by Noddy Holder
Songs written by Jim Lea
1984 songs
Song recordings produced by John Punter